Janet Lee Carey (born January 11, 1954) is an American college professor who writes fantasy fiction for children and young adults. Her novels The Dragons of Noor (2010) won a Teens Read Too Gold Star Award for Excellence,  Dragon's Keep (2007) won an ALA Best Books for Young adults, and Wenny Has Wings (2002) won the Mark Twain Award (2005).

Personal life and background

Carey was born in New York and was raised in Mill Valley, California. Carey moved to Seattle, Washington to be closer to her mother and stepfather, where she currently lives at Seattle, Washington. Carey is a very imaginative person and she finds herself daydreaming continuously throughout the day, which allows her to get into her "fantasy land" while writing.  She considers herself a homebody who enjoys reading and spending time with family and friends.

Many of Carey's novels involve an ordinary child doing heroic deeds. She believes all children need courage in order to develop into successful adults. Carey says courage requires "a sense of purpose, a belief that what I do matters, a willingness to sacrifice, and the strength to fail and keep going." Her novels show children and teens overcoming struggles and obstacles which eventually influence their development and growth as individuals.

Career

Janet Lee Carey is a successful children's literature author as well as a teacher. Her desire to become a writer began at a very young age reading her favorite authors seated high up in the branches of a tree. Although at first she was unable to progress from inspiration to publication, she eventually became a successful writer through her dedication, love of story, and passion for writing. Carey faced years of rejection; however, she kept sending her stories out. She believes that the joys far outweigh the struggles with writing.

She has taught at Lake Washington Technical college, Bellevue college, and she leads professional seminars and workshops designed for children and adults. Carey is involved in many groups including her critique group, The Diviners, and arts group, Artemis. The Diviners is a dynamic critique group which helped her progress as a writer, through the revision and analysis of her work. Artemis is a support group for artists, made up of writers, photographers, painters, collage artists, sculptures and musicians. They meet to openly discuss their goals and successes as well as the difficulties and hardships of being an artist. She is also involved with readergirlz and Society of Children's Book Writers and Illustrators. Readergirlz is an online blog which supports reading for teenage girls. SCBWI is a non-profit organization specifically for those involved with children and young adult literature.  Along with her interest in working with other writers, she is also a strong supporter of charitable organizations and environmental awareness. Carey demonstrates her support by linking each of her novels to a charitable organization, hoping to empower readers to make a difference in the world.

Between finding time for her group work and writing, Carey has also dedicated much of her time to hosting writing retreats for future authors. She tours across the United States and overseas presenting at schools and children's book festivals and conferences.

Influences

Carey's career as a writer was influenced by many different authors, books, her imagination, and personal struggles. Authors such as Ursula K. Le Guin, Juliet Marillier, Patricia A. McKillip, Shannon Hale, Kristin Cashore and many more constantly inspired her as a writer. The fantasy stories she read as a child "was the reason [she] wanted to grow up to be a writer." She was also inspired by Grimms' Fairy Tales, and stories involving myths and fantasies. Carey always had a wild imagination. As a child she believed that trees whispered to her; telling her stories in a language she couldn't understand. Her imagination helps her create vivid fantasy novels. Cary's determination to understand "things that haunt [her] and keep [her] awake at night," also influenced her writing. She began writing Stealing Death when her mother was dying and she addresses the question "Why do we have to die" throughout the novel.

Notable works

Dragon's Keep 

Rosalind is born with an unsightly dragon claw. Those who see the claw do not live long after to tell the story. Rosalind is faced with the realization that she will never find love or marry. She is captured by the Dragon Lord and her adventures begin.

Dragonswood 

Wilde Island is in a difficult situation, with the trust between the fairies, dragons and humans, being tested with the death of the king. The island is looking for a hero and young Tess, a blacksmith's daughter, is thrown into the crossfire.

In The Time of Dragon Moon

When a hidden killer slays the royal Pendragon heir, the murder is made to look like an accident, but the queen's healer, Uma, and her ally, Jackrun, sense the darker truth. Together, they must use their combined powers to outwit a secret plot to overthrow the Pendragon throne. But are they strong enough to overcome a murderer aided by prophecy and cloaked in magic? A perfectly crafted story combining medieval history, mythology, and fantasy. "This is a must-purchase for libraries owning the earlier installments and a great choice for where teen fantasy is popular." –School Library Journal

Stealing Death 

A fantasy novel based around a young boy named Kipp who has lost everything of value to him. He is left in charge of his younger sister after the rest of his family was killed in a fire. He is determined to keep those he holds close to him away from Death's soul sack.

Wenny Has Wings 
Will North loses his sister Wenny in a terrible accident. Will writes a series of letters to his sister in heaven. He believes her spirit is in a good place because of the vision he had during his Near Death Experience, but is he brave enough to tell his mother and father what he saw? "Wenny Has Wings is a powerful, emotional, highly recommended story about learning to cope with grief and loss." --Children’s Bookwatch –Midwest Book Review

"A heartrending glimpse into what happens in a family when a child dies."—Kirkus Reviews

Molly's Fire 

This novel is about a young girl who is in denial about the fact that her father has died in World War II, until she is given her father's watch. Molly risks it all to find out the truth she is trying to avoid.

The Double Life of Zoe Flynn 

Zoe's family is thrown into troubled times, with her father losing his job and their rental house suddenly being sold. They are forced to move to find work and meanwhile live in the family van. To escape the sad reality, Zoe creates a "double life". It is a story of courage and hardships.

The Beast of Noor 
"Determined to break the Shriker's curse, Miles steals a spell from his mentor, setting in motion a complex weave of force and power well beyond this world, and drawing Miles into a journey that will require all his courage, and from which only Hanna and her ingenuity can save him. One after the other, the brash, well-intentioned hero and the plucky young heroine enter a realm of betrayal, honor, destiny, and otherworldly justice. Plot twists combine with magic, suspense, legend, challenge, and redemption. [This] will appeal most to dedicated fantasy readers." --VOYA

The Dragons of Noor 

Trouble is stirring in the world of Noor. After centuries-long exile, the dragons are uneasy and about to return. A strange wind has been blowing, sweeping children up into the sky. Among the missing is Miles's and Hanna's younger brother. They go after him and find themselves fighting alongside the dragons in a life- altering revolution.

References

External links
 
 
 

1954 births
21st-century American novelists
American children's writers
American fantasy writers
People from Mill Valley, California
American women novelists
Writers from the San Francisco Bay Area
Writers from New York City
Writers from Seattle
Tamalpais High School alumni
Living people
Place of birth missing (living people) 
American women children's writers
Women science fiction and fantasy writers
21st-century American women writers
Novelists from California
Novelists from New York (state)
Novelists from Washington (state)